The Lincoln MKX is a mid-size luxury crossover SUV marketed and sold by the Lincoln brand of Ford Motor Company. As Lincoln is phasing out its use of "MK" model names, the MKX adopted the Lincoln Nautilus nameplate as part of a mid-cycle update for the 2019 model year. In production since 2007, the MKX ("X" stands for "crossover") is the first crossover SUV offered by the Lincoln brand; it is currently in its second generation. Initially the smallest Lincoln SUV, it is now slotted between the Lincoln Corsair and the Lincoln Aviator. The Lincoln counterpart of the Ford Edge CUV across both generations, the MKX has been the best-selling Lincoln model line since 2016.

The first-generation MKX was produced from 2007 to 2015, based upon the CD3 platform. The second generation is currently in production, based on the CD4 platform. Both generations of the MKX (and Nautilus) were manufactured at Oakville Assembly in Oakville, Ontario, Canada alongside the Ford Edge, Ford Flex, and Lincoln MKT.

Development
The Lincoln MKX made its first appearance as the Lincoln Aviator concept vehicle at the 2004 North American International Auto Show as a successor to the first generation Aviator. The Aviator Concept also differed from the production model stylistically and with its panoramic sunroof. The production model received the MKX nameplate, with Lincoln management suggesting a "mark ex" pronunciation during the 2006 auto show circuit, which was then changed to the phonetic M-K-X. Due to the similarity of the MKX name to the MDX name used by Acura for their competing luxury crossover, Honda, Acura's parent company, filed a lawsuit against Ford in January 2006, eventually settling the case out of court.

First generation (2007)

The 2007 MKX debuted in December 2006 as a rebadged variant of the Ford Edge. In addition to the chrome grille, the MKX's front fascia features projector-beam headlight assemblies with standard chrome-accented fog lights mounted in the lower fascia. The MKX features an optional adaptive headlight system that pivots the aim of the light projectors to match the steering inputs of the driver. In the rear, the MKX features dual chrome exhaust tips and brake lights backlit by LEDs with a light bar that crosses the MKX's liftgate. The optional sunroof, marketed as a Panoramic Vista Roof, is the production version of the glass roof feature shown on the 2004 Aviator Concept. The Vista Roof features a forward power sunroof and a fixed rear moonroof with dual power sunshades.

The interior of the MKX features leather seating surfaces and wood accents in the steering wheel, dash area, and door panels. as well as carpeting, sound-deadening, automatic headlights, dual power heated mirrors with puddle lamps, an auto-dimming rearview mirror, power windows with single touch up and down function and all-window capability, power locks, remote keyless entry with keypad, theater dimming for the interior lights, cruise control, air conditioning with automatic climate control, 8-way power driver and passenger seats, message center with compass, and a six speaker, AM/FM stereo radio with a 6-disc CD changer. Interior options include power driver and passenger lumbar supports, heated front seats, heated and cooled front seats (separate option), heated rear seats, an Easy Fold automatic folding second-row seat, a reverse sensing system, a power liftgate, a DVD-based navigation system, Sirius satellite radio, and a THX II-Certified audio system with 14 speakers. MKX's safety features include a tire pressure monitoring system, three-point seat belts, dual front-side airbags, front seat-deployed side airbags, and Safety Canopy curtain airbags.

As a rebadged variant of the Ford Edge, the MKX also shares Ford's CD3 platform, unibody construction, four-wheel independent suspension with a MacPherson strut front suspension with L-shaped lower control arms and a four-link rear suspension with stamped steel control blades and monotube shocks. Both the front and rear suspensions feature an isolated subframe and stabilizer bar. Four-wheel anti-lock disc brakes are standard in all models with Ford's AdvanceTrac traction control system with Roll Stability Control (RSC) optional. Front-wheel drive is standard and all-wheel drive is optional.

The MKX comes with standard 18-inch machined aluminum wheels with 18-inch chrome wheels optional. The sole powertrain in the MKX is an all-aluminum, 3.7 L Duratec DOHC V6 mated to Ford's 6F50 6-speed automatic transmission. The MKX, Edge, and Lincoln MKZ were the first recipients of Ford's 3.5 L Duratec V6. Front-wheel drive versions of the MKX come with a  fuel tank while all-wheel drive models come with a  fuel tank. The MKX has a base curb weight of  when front-wheel drive only and  when equipped with all-wheel drive.

For 2008 changes for the MKX included Lincoln badges added near the front doors as well as Ford Sync, Limited Edition and Monochromatic Limited Edition packages with unique styling elements and 20-inch chrome wheels, and a voice-activated DVD navigation system. Previously optional features that were now standard included AdvanceTrac with RSC, a reverse sensing system, Sirius satellite radio, the THX II-Certified audio system, heated and cooled front seats, and driver and passenger power lumbar supports. No major changes were made for the 2009 MKX.

2011 refresh

The 2011 MKX featured the first application of the all-new MyLincoln Touch driver connect technology system.

Second generation

Lincoln MKX (2016)

The second generation Lincoln MKX was revealed as a concept vehicle at the 2014 Beijing Auto Show. The production model was revealed at the 2015 North American International Auto Show and officially went on sale in the fall of 2015 as a 2016 model. The base price remained similar to the 2015 MKX at just over $38,000.

The Lincoln MKX features Bi-Xenon HID Projector Headlights, LED Daytime Running Lights, LED Fog Lights, LED Taillights, or Full Adaptive LED Headlights with LED Amber Turn Signals, LED Daytime Running lights, LED Taillights, and LED Fog Lights which replaces the standard Bi-Xenon Headlights if the Lincoln MKX is equipped with Luxury Package. Trim levels include Premiere, Select, Reserve and top level Black Label, which is three special appearance packages, a tradition started with the Designer Editions in 1976. The MKX offers the "Thoroughbred" (shared with the MKZ and the Continental), "Modern Heritage", and "Indulgence" theme appearance packages.

The transmission is no longer activated with a center console installed transmission selector; the computer controlled transmission uses buttons installed to the left of the MyLincoln Touch infotainment touch screen labeled "P, R, N, D, S". In the late 1950s a similar feature was offered on all 1957 and 1958 Mercury sedans called Multi-Drive. During the same time, Chrysler offered the push button TorqueFlite and Packard offered the Ultramatic. The "S" transmission selection represents "Sport" mode, where the Continuously Controlled Damping suspension, electric power steering and transmission shift points take on a different posture.

Lincoln Nautilus (2019) 

For the 2019 model year, the second-generation MKX underwent a mid-cycle revision, taking on the Lincoln Nautilus nameplate. Adopting the styling of the newly introduced Continental and Navigator, the Nautilus transitioned from the previous split-wing grille to a large rectangular grille with a large Lincoln star emblem.

The counterpart of the updated Ford Edge, the Nautilus is slotted between the Aviator and the MKC (which was replaced by Corsair for the 2020 model year) in Lincoln's lineup. A  2.0-litre EcoBoost inline-four is the standard engine, with a  2.7-litre EcoBoost V6 carried over from the MKX as an option; both engines are fitted with start-stop capability. An 8-speed automatic transmission is paired to both engines (replacing the previous 6-speed).

For the 2021 model year, the Nautilus was once again refreshed with a new interior similar to the new Navigator, Aviator, and Corsair, featuring a larger 13.2" touchscreen and Ford's latest SYNC 4 system. Minor changes were also made to the front bumper.

Sales

References

External links

 
 2007 Lincoln MKX Updated Press Kit with Specifications

MKX
Luxury sport utility vehicles
Mid-size sport utility vehicles
Ford CD3 platform
All-wheel-drive vehicles
Front-wheel-drive vehicles
2010s cars
2020s cars
Cars introduced in 2006
Luxury crossover sport utility vehicles